Committee on National Security Systems Instruction No. 4009, National Information Assurance Glossary, published by the United States federal government, is an unclassified glossary of Information security terms intended to provide a common vocabulary for discussing Information Assurance concepts.

The glossary was previously published as the National Information Systems Security Glossary (NSTISSI No. 4009) by the National Security Telecommunications and Information Systems Security Committee (NSTISSC).   Under Executive Order (E.O.) 13231 of October 16, 2001, Critical Infrastructure Protection in the Information Age, the President George W. Bush redesignated the National Security Telecommunications and Information Systems Security Committee (NSTISSC) as the Committee on National Security Systems (CNSS).

The most recent version was revised April 26, 2010.

See also
 Encryption

References

External links
 National Information Assurance (IA) Review
 National Information Assurance Glossary Terms

Cryptography publications
Glossaries
Publications of the United States government
Reference works in the public domain